Lisiny may refer to the following places:
Lisiny, Gmina Cekcyn in Kuyavian-Pomeranian Voivodeship (north-central Poland)
Lisiny, Gmina Śliwice in Kuyavian-Pomeranian Voivodeship (north-central Poland)
Lisiny, Rypin County in Kuyavian-Pomeranian Voivodeship (north-central Poland)
Lisiny, Masovian Voivodeship (east-central Poland)
Lisiny, Warmian-Masurian Voivodeship (north Poland)